The 1975 Barcelona WCT was a men's tennis tournament played on indoor carpet courts in Barcelona, Spain. The tournament was part of Green Group of the 1975 World Championship Tennis circuit. It was the third edition of the event and was held from 17 February through 23 February 1975. Second-seeded Arthur Ashe won the singles title.

Finals

Singles
 Arthur Ashe defeated  Björn Borg 6–4, 7–6

Doubles
 Arthur Ashe /  Tom Okker defeated  Paolo Bertolucci /  Adriano Panatta 7–5, 6–1

See also
1975 Torneo Godó

References

Barcelona WCT
1975 World Championship Tennis circuit
Barcelona WCT